Benina is a suburban borough ( formerly Basic People's Congress) administrative division of Benghazi, Libya. It contains the Benina International Airport. Benina contains at least 5 mosques and Benghazi International Airport.

References

Basic People's Congress divisions of Benghazi